Zenith is a studio album by American hip hop group Grayskul. It was released on Fake Four Inc. on September 17, 2013.

Critical reception

Chul Gugich of Beats Per Minute gave the album a 73 out of 100, saying, "Grayskul has done its part in keeping Seattle hip hop weird and unpredictable." Kyle Fleck of The Stranger described it as "a sprawling collection of 17 tracks that broadens Grayskul's core aesthetic while maintaining their trademark dark humor and densely packed wordplay, with a diverse set of beats of a quality befitting the upper echelon of the underground." Azaria C. Podplesky of Seattle Weekly stated that "a variety of lyrical content and futuristic beats keep things interesting."

Track listing

Personnel
Credits adapted from liner notes.

 Onry Ozzborn – vocals
 JFK – vocals
 Raekwon – vocals (1)
 Smoke M2D6 – production (1, 6, 11, 14)
 DJ Spark – turntables (2)
 6 Fingers – production (2)
 Reva DeVito – vocals (3)
 Void Pedal – production (3, 5, 15, 16)
 Taco Neck – production (4, 7)
 Solillaquists of Sound – vocals (5)
 NyQwil – vocals (5)
 Katie Kate – vocals (8)
 Thaddeus – vocals (8)
 Pale Soul – production (8)
 Themes – vocals (9), synthesizer (9)
 David Lincoln Mann – vocals (9)
 Bruce Waine Beatz – production (9, 10)
 Ali Baker – vocals (11), violin (11), guitar (11)
 Xperience – vocals (12)
 Kuddie Fresh – production (12)
 Aesop Rock – vocals (13), production (13)
 Snafu – vocals (16)
 Marcus D – production (17)
 Zebulon Dak – mixing, mastering
 Adam Garcia – art direction, design, illustration
 Terrance Creighton – photography

References

External links
 
 

2013 albums
Grayskul albums
Fake Four Inc. albums
Albums produced by Aesop Rock